Sumo, for the 2013 World Combat Games, took place at the St. Petersburg Sports and Concert Complex Hall 2, in Saint Petersburg, Russia, on the 18 and 19 October 2013.

Medal table

Medal summary

Men

Women

References

External links
World Combat Games Sumo Results

Sumo competitions
2013 World Combat Games events